Indian Brandy is a traditional herbal remedy for the relief of flatulence, colic and heartburn. It was dispensed by corner shops in the North and Midlands of industrial England until the early 2010s. It is mildly alcoholic.

See also 
 List of alcoholic Indian beverages

References 

Herbal liqueurs